Highland Meadows Golf Club is a private country club and golf course in the central United States, located in Sylvania, Ohio, a suburb northwest of Toledo. Founded  in 1925, it has hosted the Marathon Classic on the LPGA Tour since 1989; the event began in 1984 as the Jamie Farr

Course 

For the LPGA Tour event, the nines are switched.

References

External links

Golf clubs and courses in Ohio
Sports venues in Toledo, Ohio
Buildings and structures in Lucas County, Ohio
1925 establishments in Ohio